Sean O'Brien (born August 19, 1968) is a former Democratic member of the Ohio Senate who represented the 32nd district.  The district includes all of Ashtabula and Trumbull counties, as well as a portion of Geauga County (including the City of Chardon; but excluding Chardon Township).  O'Brien formerly served in the Ohio House of Representatives from 2011 to 2016.

Life and career
A lifelong resident of the Mahoning Valley, O'Brien went on to graduate from Edinboro University before earning his law degree from the University of Akron. O'Brien founded the Trumbull County Community Foundation, an economic development not-for-profit. He is married with two daughters. 
 
O'Brien was elected to the Ohio House of Representatives in November 2010 with 64.53% of the vote, defeating Republican Geno Capone and Independent Werner Lange. He won reelection in 2012, garnering 72.46% of the vote, and again in 2014 with 66%. Prior to his election O'Brien served as assistant prosecutor in Trumbull County.

Ohio Senate
In 2016, ten-year incumbent Capri Cafaro was ineligible to run for re-election to the Ohio Senate due to term-limits.  O'Brien made it known fairly early that he intended to succeed her. While initially he faced competition for the nomination from Tom Letson, Letson eventually dropped out.  In the primary, he faced political newcomer Kristen Rock, but defeated her easily 62% to 38% to take the nomination.

While Donald Trump won the district in 2016, O'Brien easily defeated Republican Robert Allen, 56% to 44% to take the seat in the general election.  He was sworn in on January 3, 2017.

On November 3, 2020 O'Brien lost re-election to former Ashtabula County Auditor Sandra O'Brien.

Committee assignments 

 Senate Committee on Agriculture (Ranking Minority Member)
 Senate Committee on Energy and Natural Resources (Ranking Minority Member)
 Senate Committee on Insurance and Financial Institutions
 Senate Committee on Judiciary
 Senate Committee on Local Government, Public Safety and Veteran's Affairs
 Senate Committee on Public Utilities
 Senate Committee on Ways and Means
 Senate Committee on Finance Subcommittee on General Government and Agency Review (Vice Chair)

References

External links

Democratic Party members of the Ohio House of Representatives
Living people
21st-century American politicians
Democratic Party Ohio state senators
1969 births
Edinboro University of Pennsylvania alumni
University of Akron alumni